A positional game is a kind of a combinatorial game for two players. It is described by:

a finite set of elements. Often  is called the board and its elements are called positions.
These subsets are usually called the winning-sets.
 A criterion for winning the game.

During the game, players alternately claim previously-unclaimed positions, until one of the players wins.

The classic example of a positional game is Tic-tac-toe. In it,  contains the 9 squares of the game-board,  contains the 8 lines that determine a victory (3 horizontal, 3 vertical and 2 diagonal), and the winning criterion is: the first player who holds an entire winning-set wins. Other examples of positional games are Hex and the Shannon switching game.

For every positional game there are exactly three options: either the first player has a winning strategy, or the second player has a winning strategy, or both players have strategies to enforce a draw. The main question of interest in the study of these games is which of these three options holds in any particular game.

A positional game is finite, deterministic and has perfect information; therefore, in theory it is possible to create the full game tree and determine which of these three options holds. In practice, however, the game-tree might be enormous. Therefore, positional games are usually analyzed via more sophisticated combinatorial techniques.

Alternative terminology 
Often, the input to a positional game is considered a hypergraph. In this case:

 The elements of are called vertices (or points), and denoted by V;
 The elements of are called edges (or hyperedges), and denoted by E or H.

Variants
There are many variants of positional games, differing in their rules and their winning criteria.

Different winning criteria 
Strong positional game (also called Maker-Maker game) the first player to claim all of the elements of a winning-set wins. If the game ends with all elements of the board claimed, but no player has claimed all elements of a winning set, it is a draw. An example is classic Tic-tac-toe.
Maker-Breaker game the two players are called Maker and Breaker. Maker wins by claiming all elements of a winning set. If the game ends with all elements of the board claimed, and Maker has not yet won, then Breaker wins. Draws are not possible. An example is Shannon switching game. 
Avoider-Enforcer game the players are called Avoider and Enforcer. Enforcer wins if Avoider ever claims all of the elements of a winning-set. If the game ends with all elements of the board claimed, and Avoider has not claimed a winning set, then Avoider wins. As in maker-breaker games, a draw is not possible. An example is Sim.
Discrepancy game the players are called Balancer and Unbalancer. Balancer wins if he ensures that in all winning-sets, each player has roughly half of the vertices. Otherwise Unbalancer wins.

Different game-rules 
Waiter-Client game (also called Picker-Chooser game) the players are called Waiter and Client. In each turn, Waiter picks two positions and shows them to Client, who can choose one of them. 
Biased positional game each positional game has a biased variant, in which the first player can take p elements at a time and the second player can take q elements at a time (in the unbiased variant, p=q=1).

Specific games 
The following table lists some specific positional games that were widely studied in the literature.

See also
Topological game, a generalization of a positional game to infinite sets
Banach–Mazur game, a game played on a topological space by choosing among certain subsets, with winning conditions resembling those of a maker-breaker game

References